Aykhan Taghizade (born 20 January 1996) is an Azerbaijani taekwondo practitioner who won a gold medal at the 2015 European Games.

In 2017, he competed in the men's featherweight event at the 2017 World Taekwondo Championships held in Muju, South Korea.

References

External links 
 

Living people
1996 births
Azerbaijani male taekwondo practitioners
European Games medalists in taekwondo
Taekwondo practitioners at the 2015 European Games
European Games competitors for Azerbaijan
Universiade medalists in taekwondo
Universiade silver medalists for Azerbaijan
Medalists at the 2017 Summer Universiade
Islamic Solidarity Games competitors for Azerbaijan
Islamic Solidarity Games medalists in taekwondo
21st-century Azerbaijani people